is a Japanese idol, singer, and actor. He is a member of the Japanese idol group Johnny's West, which is under the management of Johnny & Associates.

Career
Shigeoka joined Johnny & Associates, a talent agency that trains boys to become singers, in 2006. As a trainee, he was a member of the trainee group Hey! Say! 7 West (later called 7 West), which was the Kansai counterpart of Hey! Say! 7.

Shigeoka made his acting debut in 2008 in an episode of Dramatic-J, a Kansai Jr. television series. After several supporting roles, he landed his first lead role in the television series Shark: 2nd Season (2014). In April 2014, he debuted as a member Johnny's West.

Discography

Filmography

Film

Television

Stage

 Tough Weeds: Hikari no Sasu Hō e (Tough Weeds 光の射す方へ) (2009)
 Shonentachi: Kōshi naki Rōgoku (少年たち 〜格子なき牢獄〜) (2010, 2011, 2012)
 Takizawa Kabuki 2012 (滝沢歌舞伎2012) (2012)
 Shonentachi: Jail in the Sky (少年たち 〜Jail in the Sky〜) (2012)
 Another (2013)

References

1992 births
Japanese male film actors
Japanese male pop singers
Japanese male stage actors
Japanese male television actors
Japanese idols
Living people
Actors from Hyōgo Prefecture
Musicians from Hyōgo Prefecture
21st-century Japanese male actors
21st-century Japanese singers
21st-century Japanese male singers